Baumgarten is a German surname. Notable people with the surname include:

 Alexander Gottlieb Baumgarten (1714–1762), German philosopher
 Alfred Baumgarten (1842–1919), Canadian chemist and businessman of German descent 
 Armin Baumgarten (born 1967), German painter and sculptor
 Bodo Baumgarten (born 1940) German painter, sculptor, graphic artist, and educator.
 Charles Frederick Baumgarten (1739–1840), German-born violinist and organist in London
 Fritz Baumgarten (1886–1961), German footballer
 Hermann Baumgarten (1825–1893), German historian and political publicist
 Konrad Baumgarten, hero of the Swiss liberation legend, character in the drama William Tell
 Joseph M. Baumgarten (1928–2008), rabbi and Semitic scholar
 Lothar Baumgarten (1944–2018), German artist 
 Ludwig Friedrich Otto Baumgarten-Crusius (1788–1843), German Protestant theologian
 Martin Baumgarten (1507–?), German explorer
 Michael Baumgarten (1812–1889), German Protestant theologian
 Paul Clemens von Baumgarten (1848–1928), German pathologist
 Siegmund Jakob Baumgarten (1706–1757), German theologian
 Vasily Baumgarten (1879–1962), Russian and Yugoslavian architect

See also
 Harald Paumgarten, Austrian cross country skier
 Baumgart
 Baumgartner

German-language surnames